The Birdcatcher may refer to:

The Birdcatcher (novel), a 2022 novel by Gayl Jones
The Birdcatcher (film), a 2019 film by Ross Clarke